Peficitinib (trade name Smyraf) is a pharmaceutical drug used for the treatment of rheumatoid arthritis.  It belongs to the class of drugs known as Janus kinase inhibitors (JAK inhibitors).

Peficitinib was approved for use in Japan in 2019.

References 

Tyrosine kinase inhibitors
Adamantanes
Pyrrolopyridines
Tertiary alcohols
Disease-modifying antirheumatic drugs